The 2021–22 season is the 89th season of competitive football in Lebanon. The season officially began on 12 July 2021 with the Lebanese Elite Cup.

National teams

Lebanon national football team

2022 FIFA World Cup qualification

Third round: Group A

FIFA Arab Cup

Group D

Lebanon women's national football team

2021 Arab Women's Cup

Group A

2022 AFC Women's Asian Cup qualification

Group D

Men's football

AFC Cup

2021

Zonal semi-finals

2022

Group stage

Group A

Group C

Lebanese Premier League

Lebanese Second Division

Lebanese Third Division

Cup competitions

Lebanese FA Cup

Final

Lebanese Elite Cup

Final

Lebanese Challenge Cup

Final

Lebanese Super Cup

Women's football

Lebanese Women's Football League

Cup competitions

Lebanese Women's FA Cup

Lebanese Women's Super Cup

References 

 
Seasons in Lebanese football
2021 in Lebanese sport
2022 in Lebanese sport
Lebanon
Lebanon
2021 sport-related lists
2022 sport-related lists